Several Canadian naval units have been named HMCS Saskatchewan.
  (I) was a Second World War River-class destroyer.
  (II) was a Cold War-era .
 HMCS Saskatchewan was a planned Canada-class submarine cancelled in 1989

Battle honours
 Atlantic 1943–44
 Normandy 1944
 Biscay 1944

References

 Government of Canada Ship's Histories - HMCS Saskatchewan

Royal Canadian Navy ship names